Haparanda Municipality, is a municipality in Norrbotten County in northern Sweden. Its seat is located in Haparanda.

In 1967 the "City of Haparanda" was merged with the rural municipalities Karl Gustav and Nedertorneå. Since 1971 Haparanda, like all other municipalities of Sweden, is a municipality of unitary type. However, it prefers to use the title stad ("city") for the whole territory, including the non-urban parts.

Geography
In Sweden, Haparanda Municipality borders Övertorneå Municipality to the north and Kalix Municipality to the west.

Haparanda Municipality is located on the western side of where the Torne River discharges into the Bay of Bothnia. On the other side of the river lies the Finnish town Tornio (Swedish: Torneå). Haparanda and Tornio jointly call themselves "EuroCity".

Although Haparanda has a boat harbor, it is not accessible for larger vessels and is not, as often thought, the Baltic Sea's northernmost port, that honor most probably belonging to Töre further west on the Swedish coast.

The municipality includes the Haparanda archipelago, with 652 islands in the bay of Bothnia, part of the larger Norrbotten archipelago.
The Haparanda Archipelago National Park lies within the Haparanda group of islands. It includes the larger islands of Sandskär and Seskar Furö, and some smaller islands and skerries.
Some of the other islands in the Haparanda archipelago include Hanhinkari, Kataja, Seskarö, Skomakaren, Stora Hamnskär, Stora Hepokari and Torne-Furö.

Localities
There are five localities (or urban areas) in Haparanda Municipality:

The municipal seat in bold

Politics and government
Distribution of the 35 seats in the municipal council after the 2010 election:

Social Democratic Party   21
Moderate Party   6
Centre Party   4
Left Party   3
Christian Democrats   1

Results of the 2010 Swedish general election in Haparanda:

Social Democratic Party   60.4%
Moderate Party   17.2%
Centre Party   7.3%
Left Party   4.3%
Sweden Democrats   3.8%
Christian Democrats   2.6%
Green Party   2.3%
Liberal People's Party   1.5%

Twin towns – sister cities

Haparanda is twinned with:
 Hammerfest, Norway
 Kovdor, Russia
 Širvintos, Lithuania

See also
Sweden Finns
Meänkieli
List of islands of the Haparanda archipelago

References

External links

Haparanda Municipality - Official site
Haparanda-Tornio - Official tourism site

Municipalities of Norrbotten County
Meänkieli language municipalities